A Kind of Hush is the seventh studio album by American popular music duo Carpenters. It was released on June 11, 1976.

By the time of the album's recording, Richard Carpenter's addiction to sleeping pills had begun to affect him professionally, and he blames this for the album being, in his opinion, sub-par. All three excerpted singles became hits. "There's a Kind of Hush (All Over the World)", a cover of a 1960s song by Herman's Hermits, broke both the UK Top 30 and US Top 20, as well as topping the adult contemporary chart. "I Need to Be in Love" hit number 25 in the US and number 36 in the UK. "Goofus" was only a minor success, stalling at number 56 on the Billboard chart, though it did crack the adult contemporary top 10.

John Bettis called "I Need to Be in Love" the favorite lyrics he ever wrote for Karen Carpenter. "If there was ever anything that came out of my heart straight to Karen's I would say that was it. I was very proud of it for that." Richard Carpenter recalled that the song "became Karen's favorite Carpenters song". The album was also the first not to have Karen playing drums on any tracks, which were performed by Los Angeles session drummer Jim Gordon.

Despite being certified Gold, the album was a relative commercial disappointment in the US, where its chart peak was outside the Top 30. Like its predecessor Horizon, it performed better in the UK, reaching number three in the UK Albums Chart. The CD has been out of print since 2006 except in the Japanese market.

Reception

While noting that there are occasional highlights, AllMusic's retrospective review was generally negative, calling the album "pleasant, well-sung, and well-played, but basically bland". They particularly criticized the selection of material and the overt similarity of the album's formula to that of previous Carpenters albums.

Track listing

Singles
"There's a Kind of Hush"
US 7" single (1976) – A&M 1800
"There's a Kind of Hush (All Over the World)"
"(I'm Caught Between) Goodbye and I Love You"

UK 7" single (1976) – AMS7219
"There's a Kind of Hush (All Over the World)"
"(I'm Caught Between) Goodbye and I Love You"

JP 7" single (1976) – CM-2001
"There's a Kind of Hush (All Over the World)"
"(I'm Caught Between) Goodbye and I Love You"

"I Need to Be in Love"
7" single (1976) – A&M 1828
"I Need to Be in Love"
"Sandy"

JP 7" promo (1976) – CM-2020
"I Need to Be in Love"
"Sandy"

JP CD single (1995) – PODM-1060
"I Need to Be in Love"
"Top of the World"

"Goofus"
US 7" single (1976) – A&M 1859
"Goofus"
"Boat to Sail"

"Breaking Up Is Hard to Do"
JP 7" single (1976) – CM-2025
"Breaking Up Is Hard to Do"
"I Have You"

"I Have You"
MX 7" single (1978) – AM-064
"I Have You"
"Sweet, Sweet Smile"

Charts

Weekly charts

Year-end charts

Certifications

References

1976 albums
The Carpenters albums
A&M Records albums
Albums recorded at A&M Studios